Ekti Cinemar Golpo is a 2018 Bangladeshi film starring Indian actress Rituparna Sengupta and Bangladeshi stars Alamgir, Champa and Arifin Shuvoo. Alamgir produced and directed the film. The film was released on April 13, 2018. This movie is about the people involved with the film industry. The story revolves around the life of a film director his wife is an actress and an inspiring actor.

Cast
 Alamgir as Akash
 Arifin Shuvoo as Sajib
 Rituparna Sengupta as Kabita Banerjee 
 Champa as Mitali
 Chand as Mita, the child artist
 Syed Hasan Imam as Dr. Sumon Chowdhury 
 Sadek Bachchu
 Saberi Alam
 Wahida Mollick Jolly
 Boby
 Jacky Alamgir
 Dr. Sohel Babu

Soundtrack

References

External links
 

2018 films
Bengali-language Bangladeshi films
2010s Bengali-language films
Films scored by Runa Laila
Films scored by S I Tutul
Films scored by Emon Saha
Films scored by Shawkat Ali Emon